Samuel Walker may refer to:

Entertainers and sports figures
Samuel Walker (gymnast) (1883–1960), British gymnast and Olympic medalist
Samuel Walker (volleyball) (born 1995), Australian volleyball player

Politicians and military figures
Samuel Walker (Massachusetts politician) (1793–1860), mayor of Roxbury, Massachusetts, 1851–1853
Samuel Walker (1779–1851), English ironmaster, MP for Aldeburgh 1818–20
Samuel Hamilton Walker (1817–1847), US Army major in the Mexican–American War and a Texas Rangers captain
Samuel Walker (soldier) (1822–1893), American politician, and soldier
Samuel Walker (Florida politician) (1825–1881), member of the Florida Legislature and mayor of Tallahassee
Sir Samuel Walker, 1st Baronet (1832–1911), Irish politician and lawyer
Samuel S. Walker (1841–1909), American businessman and politician in Michigan

Others
Samuel Walker of Truro (1714–1761), English evangelical clergyman
J. Samuel Walker, American historian and author
Samuel Dutton Walker (1833–1885), English architect
Samuel Walker (born 1942), American police accountability expert

See also
Sam Walker (disambiguation)
Sammy Walker (disambiguation)